The 2011 Cheltenham Gold Cup was a horse race which took place at Cheltenham on Friday March 18, 2011. It was the 83rd running of the Cheltenham Gold Cup, and it was won by the pre-race favourite Long Run who beat three previous winners of the Gold Cup in Kauto Star, Denman and defending champion Imperial Commander. Long Run was ridden by Mr Sam Waley-Cohen and trained by Nicky Henderson. Waley-Cohen became the first amateur jockey to win the Cheltenham Gold Cup since Jim Wilson on Little Owl in 1981 while Long Run was the first six-year-old to win the race since Mill House in 1963.

Race details
 Sponsor: Totesport
 Winner's prize money: £285,050.00
 Going: Good
 Number of runners: 13
 Winner's time: 6m 29.70s

Full result

 Amateur jockeys indicated by "Mr".
* The distances between the horses are shown in lengths or shorter. shd = short-head; nse = nose; PU = pulled up.† Trainers are based in Great Britain unless indicated.

Winner's details
Further details of the winner, Long Run:

 Foaled: April 5, 2005 in France
 Sire: Cadoudal; Dam: Libertina (Balsamo)
 Owner: Robert Waley-Cohen
 Breeder: Mrs Marie-Christine Gabeur

References

 
 sportinglife.com

Cheltenham Gold Cup
 2011
Cheltenham Gold Cup
Cheltenham Gold Cup
2010s in Gloucestershire